Qaratureh Rural District is a rural district (dehestan) in the Central District of Divandarreh County, Kurdistan Province, Iran. At the 2006 census, its population was 9,368, in 1,888 families. The rural district has 27 villages.

References 

Rural Districts of Kurdistan Province
Divandarreh County